The 1976 season in Swedish football, starting April 1976 and ending November 1976:

Honours

Official titles

Notes

References 
Online

 
Seasons in Swedish football